The 2013 Svenska Cupen final was played on 29 October 2005. The match was played at the Råsunda Stadium in Solna.

Road to the Final

Note: In all results below, the score of the finalist is given first.

Match details

References

External links
 Official site 

Svenska Cupen Finals
Svenska Cupen Final 2005
Svenska Cupen Final 2005
Svenska Cupen Final 2005
Svenska Cupen Final
Svenska Cupen Final